This is a bibliography of works by British author and comic book writer Alan Moore.

Comics

Early work
Short stories and strips published in various British magazines and newspapers include:
 Embryo #5: "Once There Were Daemons" (script and art, Northampton Arts Lab, 1971)
 Anon #1–5: "Anon E. Mouse" (script and art, 1974–1975)
 The Back Street Bugle (EOA Books):
 "St. Pancras Panda" (script and art, in #6–12, 14, 16, 18, 22, 25, 1978–1979)
 "Moeby Palliative" (script and art, in No. 15, 1979)
 "Fat Jap Defamation Funnies" (script and art, in No. 23, 1979)
 "Just Another Day" (script, with Dick Foreman, in No. 42, 1980)
 Dark Star (as Curt Vile, Dark Star):
 "The Avenging Hunchback" (script and art, in No. 19, 1979)
 "Kultural Krime Komix" (script and art, in No. 20, 1979)
 "Talcum Power" (script and art, with Pedro Henry, aka Steve Moore, in No. 21, 1979)
 "Three Eyes McGurk and His Death Planet Commandos" (art, with Pedro Henry, in #22–25, 1979–1980) — Axel Pressbutton
 Sounds (as Curt Vile, Spotlight Publications):
 "Roscoe Moscow: Who Killed Rock n' Roll?" (script and art, 1979–1980)
 "The Stars My Degradation" (script and art, for a period with Pedro Henry, 1980–1983) — Axel Pressbutton
 "Ten Little Liggers" (script and art, 1980)
 "The Rock and Roll Zoo" (script and art, 1981)
 "Christmas on Depravity" (script and art, with Pedro Henry, 1981) — Axel Pressbutton
 "The Bride of Pressbutton" (script and art, 1982) — Axel Pressbutton
 Maxwell the Magic Cat (as Jill de Ray, script and art, strip in Northampton Post, 1979–1986, plus a new episode for the Post's final edition in December 2016)
 Scant Applause (as Curt Vile, script and art, strip in Frantic Winter Special, 1979)

Marvel UK
Titles published by Marvel UK include:
 Doctor Who Magazine: 
 "Black Legacy" (with David Lloyd, in #35–38, 1980)
 "Business as Usual" (with David Lloyd, in #40–43, 1980)
 "Star Death" (with John Stokes, in No. 47, 1980)
 "The 4-D War" (with David Lloyd, in No. 51, 1981)
 "Black Sun Rising" (with David Lloyd, in No. 57, 1981)
 Star Wars: The Empire Strikes Back Monthly/Star Wars Monthly (also collected in Star Wars Devil Worlds issues 1 and 2):
 "The Pandora Effect" (with Adolfo Buylla, in No. 151, 1981)
 "Tilotny Throws a Shape" (with John Stokes, in No. 154, 1982)
 "Rust Never Sleeps" (with Alan Davis, in No. 155, 1982)
 "Dark Lord's Conscience" (with John Stokes, in No. 156, 1982)
 "Blind Fury" (with John Stokes, in No. 159, 1982)
 Marvel Super-Heroes:
 Captain Britain Omnibus (hc, 688 pages, Marvel, 2009) includes:
 "Jaspers' Warp: Prelude" (uncredited, with Alan Davis, in No. 386, 1982)
 "A Crooked World" (with Alan Davis, in No. 387, 1982)
 "Graveyard Shift" (with Alan Davis, in No. 388, 1982)
 "A Short History of Britain" (text story, in No. 389, 1982)
 Night Raven:
 "The Cure" (text story with illustrations by Mick Austin and Paul Neary, in #390–391, 1982)
 "White Hopes, Red Nightmares" (text story with illustrations by Paul Neary, in #392-393, 1982–1983)
 "Sadie's Story" (text story with illustrations by Paul Neary, in #394–395, 1983)
 Not the World Cup (The Official Souvenir Brochure): "Not! The World Cup" (with Barrie Mitchell, 1982)
 The Daredevils:
 Captain Britain Omnibus (hc, 688 pages, Marvel, 2009) includes:
 "A Rag, a Bone, and a Hank of Hair" (with Alan Davis, in #1, 1983)
 "An Englishman's Home" (with Alan Davis, in #2, 1983)
 "Thicker Than Water" (with Alan Davis, in #3, 1983)
 "Killing Ground" (with Alan Davis, in #4–5, 1983)
 "Judgement Day" (with Alan Davis, in #6, 1983)
 "Rough Justice" (with Alan Davis, in #7, 1983)
 "Arrivals" (with Alan Davis, in #8, 1983)
 "Waiting for the End of the World" (with Alan Davis, in #9, 1983)
 "The Sound and the Fury" (with Alan Davis, in #10, 1983)
 "But They Never Really Die" (with Alan Davis, in #11, 1983)
 Night Raven:
 "The Anaesthetic, Wearing Off" (text story with illustrations by David Lloyd, in No. 6, 1983)
 "The Snow Queen" (text story with illustrations by Alan Davis, in #7–10, 1983)
 "Grit!" (with Mike Collins, in No. 8, 1983)
 The Mighty World of Marvel:
 Captain Britain Omnibus (hc, 688 pages, Marvel, 2009) includes:
 "The Candlelight Dialogues" (with Alan Davis, in #7, 1983)
 "The Twisted World (Reprise)" (with Alan Davis, in #8, 1984)
 "Among Those Dark Satanic Mills" (with Alan Davis, in #9, 1984)
 "Anarchy in the UK" (with Alan Davis, in #10, 1984)
 "Foolsmate" (with Alan Davis, in #11, 1984)
 "Endgame" (with Alan Davis, in #12, 1984)
 "A Funeral on Otherworld" (with Alan Davis, in #13, 1984)

IPC Media
Titles published by IPC Media include:
 2000 AD:
 "A Holiday in Hell" (with Dave Harwood, in Sci-Fi Special '80, 1980)
 Ro-Jaws' Robo-Tales:
 "Killer in the Cab" (with John Richardson, in No. 170, 1980)
 "The Dating Game" (with Dave Gibbons, in No. 176, 1980)
 The Complete Alan Moore Future Shocks (tpb, 208 pages, Rebellion Developments, 2011) collects:
 Ro-Jaws' Robo-Tales: "The Final Solution" (with Steve Dillon, in #189–190, 1980)
Other Short Stories:
 "Hot Item" (with John Higgins, in No. 278, 1982)
 "Dr. Dibworthy's Disappointing Day" (with Alan Langford, in No. 316, 1983)
 "The Hyper-Historic Headbang" (with Alan Davis, in No. 322, 1983)
 "The Lethal Laziness of Lobelia Loam" (with Rafael Boluda, in No. 323, 1983)

 Future Shocks:
 "Grawks Bearing Gifts" (with Q Twark, in No. 203, 1981)
 "The Return of the Two-Storey Brain!" (with Mike White, in No. 209, 1981)
 "The English/Phlondrutian Phrase Book" (with Brendan McCarthy, in No. 214, 1981)
 "The Last Rumble of the Platinum Horde" (with John Higgins, in No. 217, 1981)
 "They Sweep the Spaceways" (with Garry Leach, in No. 219, 1981)
 "The Regrettable Ruse of Rocket Redglare" (with Mike White, in No. 234, 1981)
 "A Cautionary Fable" (with Paul Neary, in No. 240, 1981)
 "Mister, Could You Use a Squonge?" (with Ron Tiner, in No. 242, 1981)
 "A Second Chance!" (with Jose Casanovas, in No. 245, 1982)
 "Twist Ending" (with Paul Neary, in No. 246, 1982)
 "Salad Days!" (with John Higgins, in No. 247, 1982)
 "The Beastly Beliefs of Benjamin Blint" (with Eric Bradbury, in No. 249, 1982)
 "All of Them Were Empty" (with Paul Neary, in No. 251, 1982)
 "An American Werewolf in Space!" (with Paul Neary, in No. 252, 1982)
 "The Bounty Hunters!" (with John Higgins, in No. 253, 1982)
 "The Wages of Sin!" (with Bryan Talbot, in No. 257, 1982)
 "Return of the Thing!" (with Dave Gibbons, in No. 265, 1982)
 "Skirmish!" (with Dave Gibbons, in No. 267, 1982)
 "The Writing on the Wall!" (with Jesus Redondo, in No. 268, 1982)
 "The Wild Frontier!" (with Dave Gibbons, in No. 269, 1982)
 "The Big Day" (with Robin Smith, in No. 270, 1982)
 "One Christmas During Eternity!" (with Jesus Redondo, in No. 271, 1982)
 "No Picnic!" (with John Higgins, in No. 272, 1982)
 "The Disturbed Digestions of Dr. Dibworthy" (with Dave Gibbons, in No. 273, 1982)
 "Sunburn" (with Jesus Redondo, in No. 282, 1982)
 "Bad Timing" (with Mike White, in No. 291, 1982)
 "Eureka!" (with Mike White, in No. 325, 1983)
 "Dad" (with Alan Langford, in No. 329, 1983)
 "Buzz Off!" (with Jim Eldridge, in No. 331, 1983)
 "Look Before You Leap!" (with Mike White, in No. 332, 1983) 
 Abelard Snazz:
 "The Double-Decker Dome Strikes Back" (with Mike White, in #237–238, 1981)
 "Halfway to Paradise" (with John Cooper, in No. 245, 1982)
 "The Multi-Storey Mind Mellows Out!" (with Paul Neary, in No. 254, 1982)
 "Genius is Pain" (with Mike White, in No. 299, 1983)
 Time Twisters:
 "The Reversible Man" (with Mike White, in No. 308, 1983)
 "Einstein" (with John Higgins, in No. 309, 1983)
 "Chronocops" (with Dave Gibbons, in No. 310, 1983)
 "The Big Clock!" (with Eric Bradbury, in No. 315, 1983)
 "Going Native" (with Mike White, in No. 318, 1983)
 "Ring Road" (with Jesus Redondo, in No. 320, 1983)
 "The Time Machine" (with Jesus Redondo, in No. 324, 1983)
 "The Startling Success of Sideways Scuttleton" (with John Higgins, in No. 327, 1983)
 "Southern Comfort" (as RE-Wright (due to Moore's dissatisfaction with the final story), with Walter Howarth, in Sci-Fi Special '81, 1981)
 Ro-Busters:
 The Complete Ro-Busters (tpb, 336 pages, Rebellion, 2008) includes:
 "Bax the Burner" (with Steve Dillon, in Annual '82, 1981)
 "Old Red Eyes is Back" (with Bryan Talbot, in Annual '83, 1982)
 "Stormeagles are Go!" (with Joe Eckers, in Annual '84, 1983)
 Rogue Trooper:
 Rogue Trooper: Tales of Nu-Earth Volume 1 (tpb, 400 pages, Rebellion, 2010) includes:
 "Pray for War" (with Brett Ewins, in Annual '83, 1982)
 "First of the Few" (with Jesus Redondo, in Annual '84, 1983)
 Skizz: "First Contact" (with Jim Baikie, in #308–330, 1983) collected as Skizz (tpb, 104 pages, Titan, 2002)
 The Complete D.R. and Quinch (tpb, 128 pages, Rebellion, 2010) collects:
 "D.R. and Quinch Have Fun on Earth!" (with Alan Davis, in #317, 1983)
 "D.R. and Quinch Go Straight" (with Alan Davis, in #350–351, 1984)
 "D.R. and Quinch Go Girl Crazy" (with Alan Davis, in #352–354, 1984)
 "D.R. and Quinch Get Drafted" (with Alan Davis, in #355–359, 1984)
 "D.R. and Quinch Go to Hollywood" (with Alan Davis, in #363–367, 1984)
 "D.R. and Quinch Get Back to Nature" (with Alan Davis, in Sci-Fi Special '85, 1985)
 The Complete Ballad of Halo Jones (tpb, 202 pages, Rebellion, 2010) collects:
 "Book 1" (with Ian Gibson, in #376–385, 1984)
 "Book 2 Prologue" (with Ian Gibson, in No. 405, 1985)
 "Book 2" (with Ian Gibson, in #406–415, 1985)
 "Book 3 Prologue" (with Ian Gibson, in No. 451, 1986)
 "Book 3" (with Ian Gibson, in #452–466, 1986)
 ABC Warriors: "Red Planet Blues" (with Steve Dillon, in Annual '85, 1984)
 Eagle:
 The Collector:
 "Trash!" (with Sven Arnstein, in No. 3, 1982)
 "Profits of Doom" (with Rex Archer and Gabor Scott, in No. 12, 1982)
 Scream!:
 Monster (with Heinzl, in #1, 1984, collected in tpb, 192 pages, Rebellion, 2016)

Other UK publishers
Titles published by various British publishers include:
 Warrior (Quality Communications):
 Marvelman (with Garry Leach, Alan Davis and John Ridgway, in #1–18 and 20–21, 1982–1984)
 The series was colourised, reprinted (in six issues) and continued (by Eclipse, 1985–1989).
 The story called "The Yesterday Gambit" (from Warrior #4) was not reprinted, but semi-adapted into Marvelman No. 15.
 In 1984, Marvelman Special was released. It consists of several Mick Anglo reprints wrapped in a framing sequence written by Moore.
 V for Vendetta (with David Lloyd, in #1–26, 1982–1985)
 The series was colourised, reprinted (in seven issues) and continued (by DC Comics, 1988–1989).
 Warpsmith: "Cold War, Cold Warrior" (with Garry Leach, in #9–10, 1983)
 The Bojeffries Saga:
 The Complete BoJeffries Saga (tpb, 80 pages, Kitchen Sink, 1994) includes:
 "The Rentman Cometh" (with Steve Parkhouse, in No. 12, 1983)
 "One of Our Rentmen is Missing" (with Steve Parkhouse, in No. 13, 1983)
 "Raoul's Night Out" (with Steve Parkhouse, in #19–20, 1983)
 Fantasy Advertiser #77: "Moonstone: Tomorrow's Truth" (with Mike Collins, 1983)
 Speakeasy #43: "Nutters Ruin" (as Curt Vile, an unsold 1979 strip that was discontinued after one episode, script and art, 1984)
 Food for Thought: "Cold Snap" (with Bryan Talbot, Flying Pig, 1985)
 Mad Dog #10: "Captain Airstrip One" (with Chris Brasted, Oddmags, 1985)
 A1 (Atomeka):
 Warpsmith: "Ghostdance" (with Garry Leach, in No. 1, 1989)
 The Complete BoJeffries Saga (tpb, 80 pages, Kitchen Sink, 1994) includes:
 "Festus: Dawn of the Dead" (with Steve Parkhouse, in #1, 1989)
 "Sex with Glinda BoJeffries" (with Steve Parkhouse, in #2, 1990)
 "A Quiet Christmas with the Family" (with Steve Parkhouse, in #3, 1990)
 "Song of the Terraces" (with Steve Parkhouse, in #4, 1990)
 "Our Factory Fortnight" (with Steve Parkhouse, in A1 True Life Bikini Confidential, 1990)
 Knockabout:
 Knockabout Trial Special: "Brasso with Rosie" (text story with illustrations by Savage Pencil, 1984)
 Outrageous Tales from the Old Testament: "Leviticus" (with Hunt Emerson, anthology graphic novel, tpb, 64 pages, 1987)
 Seven Deadly Sins: "Lust" (with Mike Matthews, 1989)
 Heartbreak Hotel (Willyprods):
 "Letter from Northampton" (script and art, in No. 1, 1988)
 "I Can Hear the Grass Grow" (script and art, in No. 3, 1988)
 Mad Love:
 AARGH! #1: "The Mirror of Love" (with Rick Veitch and Stephen R. Bissette, 1988)
 Big Numbers #1–2 (of projected 12) (with Bill Sienkiewicz, 1990)
 A Small Killing (with Oscar Zarate, graphic novel, hc, 96 pages, VG Graphics, 1991)
 RAW Volume 2 #3: "The Bowing Machine" (with Mark Beyer, Penguin, 1991)
 It's Dark in London: "I Keep Coming Back" (with Oscar Zarate, graphic novel, tpb, 120 pages, Mask Noir, 1996)

DC Comics/Vertigo
Titles published by DC Comics include:
 The Saga of Swamp Thing (with Stephen R. Bissette, Shawn McManus, Rick Veitch, Stan Woch, John Totleben and others, 1984–1987) collected as:
 Volume 1 (collects #20–27, hc, 208 pages, 2009, ; tpb, 2012)
 Volume 2 (collects #28–34, Annual #2, hc, 224 pages, 2009, ; tpb, 2012)
 Volume 3 (collects #35–42, hc, 208 pages, 2010)
 Volume 4 (collects #43–50, hc, 224 pages, 2011)
 Volume 5 (collects #51–56, hc, 168 pages, 2011)
 Volume 6 (collects #57–61, 63–64, hc, 208 pages, 2011)
 DC Universe: The Stories of Alan Moore (tpb, 304 pages, 2006) collects:
 Detective Comics #549–550: "Green Arrow: Night Olympics" (with Klaus Janson, co-feature, 1985)
 Omega Men:
 "Vega: Brief Lives" (with Kevin O'Neill, co-feature, in No. 26, 1985)
 "Vega: A Man's World" (with Paris Cullins, co-feature, in No. 27, 1985)
 Vigilante #17–18: "Father's Day" (with Jim Baikie, 1985)
 Green Lantern #188: "Mogo Doesn't Socialize" (with Dave Gibbons, co-feature, 1985)
 Superman Annual #11: "For the Man Who Has Everything" (with Dave Gibbons, 1985)
 DC Comics Presents #85: "Superman/Swamp Thing: The Jungle Line" (with Rick Veitch, 1985)
 Tales of the Green Lantern Corps Annual:
 "Tygers" (with Kevin O'Neill, in No. 2, 1986)
 "In Blackest Night" (with Bill Willingham, in No. 3, 1987)
 Superman: Whatever Happened to the Man of Tomorrow?:
 "Part One" (with Curt Swan, in Superman No. 423, 1986)
 "Part Two" (with Curt Swan, in Action Comics No. 583, 1986)
 In 2009, Whatever Happened to the Man of Tomorrow? was reprinted in a Deluxe Edition HC, which also contains "For the Man Who Has Everything" and "The Jungle Line".
 Secret Origins #10: "Phantom Stranger: Footsteps" (with Joe Orlando, 1987)
 Batman Annual #11: "Mortal Clay" (with George Freeman, 1987)
 Batman: The Killing Joke (with Brian Bolland, one-shot, 1988)
 In 2008, The Killing Joke was recolored and reprinted in a 20th Anniversary HC, and this collection was revised to remove the story.
 In 2012, a hardcover entitled DC Universe by Alan Moore (464 pages) was released. This volume included all the stories from DC Universe: The Stories of Alan Moore and Alan Moore: Wild Worlds except for Batman: The Killing Joke and the Spawn/WildC.A.T.s miniseries.
 Watchmen #1–12 (with Dave Gibbons, 1986–1987) collected as tpb, 334 pages, 1987, ; hc, 464 pages, 2005, 
 V for Vendetta #1–10 (with David Lloyd, 1988–1989) collected as tpb, 288 pages, 1995, ; hc, 396 pages, 2009,

Eclipse Comics
Titles published by Eclipse include:
 Miracleman (with Garry Leach, Alan Davis, John Ridgway, Chuck Beckum, Rick Veitch and John Totleben, 1985–1989) collected as:
 A Dream of Flying (collects #1–3, tpb, 80 pages, 1990, ; hc, 1990)
 Red King Syndrome (collects #4–7 and 9–10, tpb, 128 pages, 1991, ; hc, 1991)
 Olympus (collects #11–16, tpb, 128 pages, 1991, ; hc, 1991)
 Doc Stearn...Mr. Monster #3: "The Riddle of the Recalcitrant Refuse" (with Michael T. Gilbert, 1985)
 Real War Stories #1: "Tapestries" (with Stan Woch, John Totleben and Stephen R. Bissette, 1987)
 Brought to Light: "Shadowplay: The Secret Team" (with Bill Sienkiewicz, graphic novel, tpb, 31 pages, 1989)

Image Comics/Awesome Comics
Titles published by Image and its Awesome imprint include:
 Spawn:
 "In Heaven (Everything is Fine)" (with Todd McFarlane, in No. 8, 1993) collected in Spawn: Dark Discoveries (tpb, 120 pages, 1997)
 "Blood Feud: Preludes & Nocturnes" (with Tony Daniel, co-feature, in No. 32, 1995)
 Spawn: Blood Feud #1–4 (with Tony Daniel, 1995)
 "The Freak" (with Todd McFarlane and Greg Capullo, in No. 37, 1995) collected in Spawn: Betrayal of Blood (tpb, 96 pages, 1999)
 1963 #1–6 (with Rick Veitch and Stephen R. Bissette, 1993)
 Violator:
 Violator #1–3: "The World" (with Bart Sears and Greg Capullo, 1994)
 Violator vs. Badrock #1–4 (with Brian Denham, 1994) collected as Violator vs. Badrock: Rocks & Hard Places (tpb, 96 pages, 1998)
 Shadowhawks of Legend #1: "Shadows in the Sand" (with Steve Leialoha, 1995)
 The Maxx No. 21 (with Sam Kieth, 1996) collected in The Maxx Volume 4 (tpb, 144 pages, 2005)
 Supreme:
 The Story of the Year (tpb, 332 pages, Checker Book Publishing, 2003) collects:
 "The Supreme Story of the Year..." (with Joe Bennett and Keith Giffen, in No. 41, 1996)
 "Secret Origins" (with Joe Bennett and Rick Veitch, in No. 42, 1996)
 "Obscured Clouds!" (with Dan Jurgens, Joe Bennett and Rick Veitch, in No. 43, 1996)
 "The Age of Gold" (with Richard Horie, Bill Wray and Rick Veitch, in No. 44, 1996)
 "Featuring Supreme's Pal Billy Friday" (with Joe Bennett and Rick Veitch, in No. 45, 1997)
 "The Girl of Our Dreams!" (with J Morrigan and Rick Veitch, in No. 46, 1997)
 "The Finest of All Possible Worlds" (with J Morrigan, Joe Bennett and Rick Veitch, in No. 47, 1997)
 "Just Imagine" (with Mark Pajarillo, Stephen Platt and Rick Veitch, in No. 48, 1997)
 "There is a Light That Never Goes Out..." (with Mark Pajarillo, in No. 49, 1997)
 "A Love Supreme" (with Chris Sprouse, Stephen Platt and Rick Veitch, in No. 50, 1997)
 "A Roster of Rogues" (with J Morrigan and Rick Veitch, in No. 51, 1997)
 "The Return of Darius Dax" (with J Morrigan and Mark Pajarillo, in #52A-52B, 1997)
 "Tales of the Supremacy featuring Squeak the Supremouse" (with Kevin O'Neill, in #52A, 1997)
 "Public Service Announcement: National Flashlight Battery Inspection Day!" (with Rick Veitch, in #52B, 1997)
 The Return (tpb, 258 pages, Checker Book Publishing, 2003) collects:
 "19th Dimensional Nervous Breakdown!" (with Chris Sprouse, in #53, 1997)
 "The Ballad of Judy Jordan" (with Melinda Gebbie, Chris Sprouse and Rick Veitch, in No. 54, 1997)
 "Silence at Gettysburg" (with Gil Kane and Chris Sprouse, in No. 55, 1997)
 "The Mirror Crack'd from Side to Side" (with Chris Sprouse and Rick Veitch, in No. 56, 1998)
 Supreme: The Return #1–6 (with Chris Sprouse, Jim Starlin, Rick Veitch, Jim Baikie, Matthew Dow Smith, Ian Churchill and Rob Liefeld, 1999–2000)
 "Special Bonus Feature!" (with J Morrigan, in No. 54, 1997)
 "Revelations" (with Erik Larsen, in No. 63, 2012)
 Judgment Day (tpb, 162 pages, Checker Book Publishing, 2003) collects:
 "Heroes, Heroines & Homicide" (with Rob Liefeld, Gil Kane, Stephen Platt, Keith Giffen, Adam Pollina and Dan Jurgens, in #Α, 1997)
 "The Trial" (with Rob Liefeld, Chris Sprouse, Steve Skroce, Stephen Platt, Jim Starlin and Terry Dodson, in #Ω, 1997)
 "Brought to Book" (with Rob Liefeld, Jeff Johnson, Rick Veitch and Ian Churchill, in No. 3, 1997)
 "Youngblood Prologue featuring Shaft" (with Steve Skroce, in Awesome Holiday Special, 1997)
 Judgment Day: Aftermath (with Gil Kane, one-shot, 1998)
 Youngblood:
 "A Brief History of Twilight" (with Steve Skroce, in #1+, 1997)
 "Prologue (featuring Shaft)" (with Steve Skroce, in #1+, 1997)
 "Occupations" (with Steve Skroce, in v3 No. 1, 1998)
 "Bad Blood" (with Steve Skroce, in v3 No. 2, 1998)
 "Dandy in the Underworld" (with Steve Skroce, in Awesome Adventures! No. 1, 1999)
 Alan Moore's Awesome Universe Handbook (with Alex Ross, 1999)
 Glory #0: "Glory and the Gate of Tears" (with Brandon Peterson, 1999)
 Mr. Monster's Gal Friday... Kelly #3: "It's Kelly's Boyfriend... Mr. Monster – Shopping" (with Alan Smith and Pete Williamson, 2000)
 24 Panels: "If Einstein's Right..." (with Melinda Gebbie, 2018)

Wildstorm/America's Best Comics
Titles published by Wildstorm and its ABC imprint include:
 WildC.A.T.s (with Travis Charest, Kevin Maguire, Ryan Benjamin, Jason Johnson, Dave Johnson, Mat Broome and others, 1995–1998) collected as:
 Homecoming (collects #21–27, tpb, 208 pages, 1999)
 Gang War (collects #28–34, tpb, 176 pages, 1999)
 Alan Moore's Complete WildC.A.T.s (collects #21–34 and 50, tpb, 392 pages, 2007)
 Fire From Heaven #1–2 (with Ryan Benjamin, Chuck Gibson, Jim Lee, 1996)
 Alan Moore: Wild Worlds (tpb, 320 pages, 2007) collects:
 Spawn/WildC.A.T.S. #1–4: "Devilday" (with Scott Clark, 1996)
 Wildstorm Spotlight: Majestic: "The Big Chill" (with Carlos D'Anda, one-shot, 1997)
 Voodoo #1–4: "Dancing in the Dark" (with Michael Lopez and Al Rio, 1997)
 WildC.A.T.S #50: "Reincarnation" (with Travis Charest, 1998)
 Deathblow: Byblows #1–3 (with Jim Baikie, 1999–2000)
 The League of Extraordinary Gentlemen:
 Book One #1–6 (with Kevin O'Neill, 1999–2000) collected as Volume 1 (hc, 176 pages, 2000, ; tpb, 2002)
 Book Two #1–6 (with Kevin O'Neill, 2002–2003) collected as Volume 2 (hc, 224 pages, 2003, ; tpb, 2004)
 The Black Dossier (with Kevin O'Neill, graphic novel, hc, 208 pages, 2007)
 Tom Strong:
 Tom Strong (with Chris Sprouse, Art Adams, Jerry Ordway, Dave Gibbons, Gary Frank, Alan Weiss, Paul Chadwick, Gary Gianni, Kyle Baker, Russ Heath, Pete Poplaski, Hilary Barta and Howard Chaykin, 1999–2006) collected as:
 Book One (collects #1–7, hc, 208 pages, 2000, ; tpb, 2001)
 Book Two (collects #8–14, hc, 192 pages, 2002, ; tpb, 2003)
 Book Three (collects #15–19, hc, 144 pages, 2004, ; tpb, 2005)
 Book Four (includes #20–22, hc, 160 pages, 2005, ; tpb, 2005)
 Book Six (includes #36, hc, 160 pages, 2006, ; tpb, 2008)
 Tom Strong's Terrific Tales (anthology, with Paul Rivoche, Jaime Hernandez, Jerry Ordway, Jason Pearson, Shawn McManus, Michael Kaluta, Bruce Timm and Peter Bagge, 2002–2005) collected as:
 Book One (includes stories from #1–6, hc, 176 pages, 2005, ; tpb, 2005)
 Book Two (includes stories from #7–9 and 11–12, hc, 160 pages, 2005, ; tpb, 2011)
 Many Worlds of Tesla Strong (with Peter Hogan, Art Adams, J. Scott Campbell, Claudio Castellini, Frank Cho, José Luis García-López, Michael Golden, Phil Noto, Jason Pearson and Chris Sprouse, one-shot, 2003) collected in America's Best Comics (tpb, 192 pages, 2004)
 Promethea (with J.H. Williams III, Charles Vess and Jose Villarrubia, 1999–2005) collected as:
 Book 1 (collects #1–6, hc, 160 pages, 2000, ; tpb, 2001)
 Book 2 (collects #7–12, hc, 176 pages, 2001, ; tpb, 2003)
 Book 3 (collects #13–18, hc, 176 pages, 2002, ; tpb, 2003)
 Book 4 (collects #19–25, hc, 192 pages, 2003, ; tpb, 2005)
 Book 5 (collects #26–32, hc, 200 pages, 2005, ; tpb, 2006)
 Absolute Promethea I (collects #1–12, hc, 328 pages, 2009)
 Absolute Promethea II (collects #13–24, hc, 328 pages, 2010)
 Absolute Promethea III (collects #25–32, hc, 328 pages, 2011)
 Top 10:
 Top 10 (with Gene Ha and Zander Cannon, 1999–2001) collected as:
 Book One (collects #1–7, hc, 208 pages, 2000, ; tpb, 2001)
 Book Two (collects #8–12, hc, 144 pages, 2002, ; tpb, 2003)
 Smax #1–5 (with Zander Cannon, 2003–2004) collected as Smax (hc, 128 pages, 2004, ; tpb, 2005)
 The 49ers (with Gene Ha, graphic novel, hc, 112 pages, 2005)
 Tomorrow Stories:
 Tomorrow Stories (with Kevin Nowlan, Rick Veitch, Jim Baikie, Melinda Gebbie, Hilary Barta, Dame Darcy and Joyce Chin, 1999–2002) collected as:
 Book One (collects #1–6, hc, 176 pages, 2002, ; tpb, 2003)
 Book Two (collects #7–12, hc, 160 pages, 2004, ; tpb, 2005)
 Tomorrow Stories Special #1–2 (with Steve Moore, Kevin Nowlan, Hilary Barta, Rick Veitch and Jim Baikie, 2006)
 America's Best Comics Special (with Steve Moore, Kevin Nowlan, Zander Cannon, Sergio Aragonés, Kevin O'Neill, Kyle Baker, Dame Darcy and Chris Sprouse, 2001) collected in America's Best Comics (tpb, 192 pages, 2004)
 Terra Obscura (with Peter Hogan and Yanick Paquette, v1: 2003–2004, v2: 2004–2005) collected as:
 Volume 1 (collects #1–6, tpb, 160 pages, 2004)
 Volume 2 (collects #1–6, tpb, 144 pages, 2005)
 Albion #1–6 (plot, scripted by Leah Moore and John Reppion, art by Shane Oakley and George Freeman, 2005–2006) collected as Albion (tpb, 144 pages, 2006)

Other US publishers
Titles published by various American publishers include:
 American Flagg! (First Comics):
 "The Hot Slot" (with Larry Stroman, in No. 21, co-feature, 1985)
 "Machines of Joy" (with Larry Stroman, in No. 22, co-feature, 1985)
 "There is a Heppy Land, Fur, Fur Away..." (with Larry Stroman, in No. 23, co-feature, 1985)
 "Zen and the Art of Motormater Maintenance" (with Don Lomax, in No. 24, co-feature, 1985)
 "Medea Blitz: Welcome to the Pleasure Dome" (with Don Lomax, in #25, co-feature, 1985)
 "QUSA The Peoples' Choice" (with Don Lomax, in #26, co-feature, 1985)
 "The Erogenous Zone" (with Don Lomax, in #27, 1985)
 Marvel:
 Heroes for Hope: Starring the X-Men (with Richard Corben, pages 16–18, 1985)
 Heroes: "Now We are All in Guernica" (with Dave Gibbons, one-shot, 2001)
 Epic Illustrated #34: "Love Doesn't Last Forever" (with Rick Veitch, Epic, 1986) collected in Shiny Beasts (tpb, 86 pages, King Hell, 2007)
 Fantagraphics:
 Dalgoda #8: "Batfishing in Suburbia" (with Steve Parkhouse, 1986) collected in Complete BoJeffries Saga (tpb, 80 pages, 1994)
 Anything Goes! #2: "In Pictopia" (with Don Simpson, 1986)
 Critters #23: "The Sinister Ducks" (text story with illustrations by Doug Erb and Kevin O'Neill, 1988)
 Honk:
 "Brasso with Rosie" (with Peter Bagge, in No. 2, 1987)
 "Globetrotting for Agoraphobics" (with Eddie Campbell, in No. 4, 1987)
 Hate #30: "The Hasty Smear of My Smile" (with Peter Bagge, 1998)
 Meat Cake #9: "Hungry is the Heart" (with Dame Darcy, 1999)
 Myra #8: "A True Story" (with Myra Hancock, Myra Magazines, 1986)
 Taboo (Spiderbaby Graphix):
 "Come on Down" (with Bill Wray, in No. 1, 1988)
 From Hell (with Eddie Campbell, in #2–7, 1989–1992)
 The series was reprinted (in three issues) and continued (by Tundra/Kitchen Sink, 1991–1998).
 Lost Girls (with Melinda Gebbie, in #5–7, 1991–1992)
 The series was reprinted (by Tundra, 1995–1996) and completed (by Top Shelf, 2006).
 The Puma Blues #20: "Act of Faith" (with Stephen R. Bissette and Michael Zulli, Aardvark-Vanaheim, 1988)
 Corpsemeat Comix #2: "Driller Penis: Yes... He Does What You Think He Does" (with Savage Pencil, Sympathetic Press, 1989)
 American Splendor #15: "Bob Wachsman Tummler" (art, with Harvey Pekar, HP Comics, 1990)
 Kitchen Sink:
 From Hell #1–11 (with Eddie Campbell, 1991–1998) collected as From Hell (tpb, 572 pages, Top Shelf, 2000)
 Images of Omaha #2: "Dr. Omaha Presents Venus in Fur: Candid Chit-Chats with Cartoon Kit-Cats" (with Melinda Gebbie, 1992)
 The Spirit: The New Adventures:
 Will Eisner's The Spirit Archives Volume 27 (hc, 232 pages, Dark Horse, 2009) includes:
 "The Most Important Meal" (with Dave Gibbons, in #1, 1998)
 "Gossip and Gertrude Granch" (with Dave Gibbons, in #1, 1998)
 "Force of Arms" (with Dave Gibbons, in #1, 1998)
 "Last Night I Dreamed of Doctor Cobra" (with Daniel Torres, in No. 3, 1998)
 Negative Burn (Caliber):
 Alan Moore's Songbook (tpb, 64 pages, 1998) collects:
 "London" (with Richard Case, in No. 10, 1994)
 "Positively Bridge Street" (with Phillip Hester, in No. 11, 1994)
 "14.2.99" (with Dave Johnson, in No. 12, 1994)
 "The Murders on the Rue Morgue" (with Neil Gaiman, in No. 13, 1994)
 "Fires I Wish I'd Seen" (with Colleen Doran, in No. 14, 1994)
 "Madame October" (with Terry Moore, in No. 16, 1994)
 "The Hair of the Snake That Bit Me" (with Bill Koeb, in No. 17, 1994)
 "Trampling Tokyo" (with Art Adams, in No. 18, 1994)
 "Litvinov's Book" (with Richard Pace, in No. 19, 1995)
 "Chiaroscuro" (with Dave Gibbons, in No. 25, 1995)
 "Me and Dorothy Parker" (with Michael Gaydos, in No. 26, 1995)
 "Rose Madder" (with James Owen, in No. 28, 1995)
 "Leopard Man at C&A's" (with Jordan Raskin, in No. 35, 1996)
 "Another Suburban Romance" (with Ken Meyer, Jr., in No. 9, 1994)
 "Town of Lights" (with Mark Rickets, in No. 37, 1996)
 Outbreaks of Violets: Random Acts of Kindness (with various European illustrators, 24 postcards designed by Rian Hughes, MTV EMA booklet, 1995)
 Kimota #3: "The Nativity on Ice" (as Curt Vile, with Bryan Talbot, Preston Speculative Fiction Group, 1995)
 Vampirella/Dracula: The Centennial: "The New European" (with Gary Frank, one-shot, Harris, 1997)
 Nightmare Theatre #4: "Itchy Peterson: Born Lucky I Guess" (with Val Semeiks, Chaos!, 1997)
 Tales of Midnight: "The Serpent and the Sword" (text story with illustrations by Michael Fiamanya, Blue Silver, 1999)
 The Worm: The Longest Comic Strip in the World (storyline, scripted by Jamie Delano, Steve Moore, Andrew Cartmel, Garth Ennis and Hilary Robinson, drawn by "a galaxy of greats", graphic novel, tpb, 64 pages, Slab-O-Concrete, 1999)
 Unknown Quantities: "Sidewalk Jockeys" (text story with illustrations by Guy Davis, Funny Valentine, 2000)
 Kimota: The Miracleman Companion: "Lux Brevis" (a previously unpublished strip that was discontinued after one episode, with John Totleben, tpb, 148 pages, TwoMorrows, 2001)
 9-11 Volume 1: "This is Information" (text story with illustrations by Melinda Gebbie, graphic novel, tpb, 196 pages, Dark Horse, 2002)
 Avatar:
Alan Moore's Glory #1–2 (of planned 4) (with Marat Mychaels, Melinda Gebbie and Matt Martin, 2001–2002)
 Alan Moore's Yuggoth Cultures and Other Growths (tpb, 312 pages, 2007) collects:
 "Zaman's Hill" (with Juan Jose Ryp, in No. 1, 2003)
 "NightJar" (with Bryan Talbot, in No. 1, 2003)
 "Recognition" (with Jacen Burrows, in No. 2, 2003)
 "Me and Dorothy Parker" (with Marat Mychaels, in No. 3, 2003)
 As well as reprints of some previously published short stories.
 Neonomicon #1–4 (with Jacen Burrows, 2010–2011) collected as hc, 176 pages, 2011, ; tpb, 2011, 
 God Is Dead (comics): Book of Acts #Alpha (with Facundo Percio, 2014)
 Crossed: +100 #1–6 (with Gabriel Andrade, 2014–2015) collected as tpb, 160 pages, 2015, 
 Providence #1–12 (with Jacen Burrows, 2015–2017)
Cinema Purgatorio #1–18 (with Kevin O'Neill, 2016–2019)
 Top Shelf:
 Lost Girls Volume 1–3 (with Melinda Gebbie, graphic novel, hc, 264 pages, 2006)
 Recollected as a single-volume edition in 2009 (hc, 320 pages).
 Top Shelf Asks The Big Questions: "La Toile's Casebook of the Crepuscular: Brighter Than You Think"  (with Melinda Gebbie, 2003)
 Story written for Cobweb from Tomorrow Stories, but was rejected by DC Comics
 The League of Extraordinary Gentlemen: Century:
 1910 (with Kevin O'Neill, graphic novel, tpb, 80 pages, 2009)
 1969 (with Kevin O'Neill, graphic novel, tpb, 80 pages, 2011)
 2009 (with Kevin O'Neill, graphic novel, tpb, 80 pages, 2012)
 Nemo Trilogy:
 Nemo: Heart of Ice (with Kevin O'Neill, graphic novel, hc, 56 pages, 2013)
 Nemo: Roses of Berlin (with Kevin O'Neill, graphic novel, hc, 56 pages, 2014) 
 Nemo: River of Ghosts (with Kevin O'Neill, graphic novel, hc, 56 pages, 2015)
 The League of Extraordinary Gentlemen: The Tempest #1–6 (with Kevin O'Neill, 2018–2019)
 Electricomics app:
 "Big Nemo" (digital comic, 2015)

Text stories and prose
 "A Hypothetical Lizard" (in Liavek: Wizard's Row, Ace Books, 1987; The Year's Best Fantasy, 1989; Demons and Dreams, 1989; Words Without Pictures, 1990)
 "Alphabets of Desire" (limited print designed and lettered by Todd Klein, available only from Klein's website)
 "Belly of Cloud" (unpublished comics script printed in The Extraordinary Works of Alan Moore)
 "The Children's Hour" (in Now We Are Sick, 1991)
 "The Courtyard" (in The Starry Wisdom: A Tribute to H. P. Lovecraft, February 1995)
 "Fuseli's Disease" (in The Thackery T. Lambshead Pocket Guide to Eccentric & Discredited Diseases, edited by Jeff VanderMeer and Mark Roberts, 2003, pages 89–91)
 "The Gun" (in Batman Annual, 1985, UK; illustrated by Garry Leach)
 "Here Comes the Jetsons" (in Sounds, 4 April 1981; illustrated by Moore)
 "I was Superman's Double" (in Superman Annual, 1985, UK; illustrated by Bob Wakelin)
 "Judge Dredd" (unpublished comics script printed in The Extraordinary Works of Alan Moore)
 "Light of Thy Countenance" (in Forbidden Acts, Avon Books, October 1995)
 "Mystery and Abomination" (in Sounds, 8 August 1981; illustrated by Moore)
 "Protected Species" (Superman story in The Superheroes Annual, 1984; illustrated by Bryan Talbot)
 "Recognition" (in Dust: A Creation Book Reader)
 "Sawdust Memories" (in Knave, December 1984)
 "Shrine of the Lizard" (in Weird Window No. 2, 1971; reprinted in The Extraordinary Works of Alan Moore)
 "Terror Couple Kill Telegram Sam in the Flat Field" (in Sounds, 14 February 1982, the title is a reference to the band Bauhaus; illustrated by Moore)
 "To The Humfo" (poem, in Weird Window No. 1, 1970)
 "Zaman's Hill" (in Dust: A Creation Book Reader, 1996)
 "Between the Angels and the Apes" (in Strange Attractor #4, 2011)
 "Objects Discovered in a Novel Under Construction" (in The Thackery T. Lambshead Cabinet of Curiosities, 2011)
 "The Town Planning in Dreams" (in Test Centre Magazine #6, 2015)
 Illuminations: Stories, 2022, Bloomsbury. .

Novels and illustrated books
 Voice of the Fire, 1996, Victor Gollancz; 1997, Orion Books; republished 2003, Top Shelf Productions. This new edition features a dust jacket designed by Chip Kidd, an introduction by Neil Gaiman and thirteen colour plates by José Villarrubia. Paperback edition released 15 July 2009, Top Shelf Productions.
 The Mirror of Love, 2003, Top Shelf Productions. A new version of his story for AARGH (Artists Against Rampant Government Homophobia). This edition features an introduction by David Drake and forty-one colour illustrations by José Villarrubia.
 25,000 Years of Erotic Freedom, 2009, Abrams. Illustrating the essay from Arthur magazine. .
 Jerusalem, 2016, Knockabout (London); 2016, Liveright (New York). .
 The Moon and Serpent Bumper Book of Magic (with co-writer Steve Moore and artists including Kevin O'Neill, Melinda Gebbie, John Coulthart, Rick Veitch and José Villarrubia, 320 pages, hardcover, Top Shelf, forthcoming)

Films

 Show Pieces (2012), short film anthology directed by Mitch Jenkins, written by Alan Moore
 The Show (2021), feature film adaptation of and sequel to Show Pieces, directed by Mitch Jenkins, written by Moore

Non-fiction

As well as his run on Captain Britain in The Daredevils Moore contributed text Night Raven stories, fanzine reviews and a number of long articles (writing up to 24 pages out of the 54, for example in issue #5). The non-fiction pieces include:

 "The Importance of Being Frank" (The Daredevils #1, about Frank Miller, 1983)
 "Stan Lee: Blinded by the Hype – An Affectionate Character Assassination" (The Daredevils #3–4, 1983)
 "Invisible Girls and Phantom Ladies" (The Daredevils #4–6, about sexism in comics, 1983)
 "O Superman: Music & comics" (The Daredevils #5, 1983)
 "About the Special Executive" (The Daredevils #5, 1983)

Other work includes:
 "C.B.? – That's a Big Ten-Four!" and "Bear's Monkey Business" in B.J. and the Bear Annual 1982 (1981), article and illustrations
 "Too Avant Garde for the Mafia?" (in Infinity #7–8, 1984–1985)
 "Alan Moore's Writing for Comics", Avatar Press, (published previously in Fantasy Advertiser 92–95, August 1985 – February 1986 and The Comics Journal 119–121, 1988)
 "Comments on Crumb" (in Blab No. 3, 1988)
 Comics Forum 4, 1993, transcript of a lecture discussing 1963, feminism, pornography and Image comics
 Comics Journal No. 167, 1994, tribute to Jack Kirby
 "Correspondence: From Hell", 1997, letters between Moore and Dave Sim in Cerebus #217–220; reprinted in Alan Moore: Portrait of an Extraordinary Gentleman.
 Beyond our Ken, 2002, review of works by Kenneth Grant, published at free magazine, KAOS issue 14
 "Rolling Commentary", a political essay on the "War on Terror" (in Arthur Magazine No. 5, July 2003)
 "Indoor Thunder: Landscaping the Future With Brian Eno"(in Arthur #17, July 2005)
 Technical Vocabularies: Games for May (Poetry, with Steve Moore, Somnium Press, 2004; limited edition, 101 signed and numbered copies)
 Unearthing, 2006, about Steve Moore, in London: City of Disappearances, edited by Iain Sinclair, hardcover , paperback .
 "Bog Venus Versus Nazi Cock-Ring: Some Thoughts Concerning Pornography" (cached) (in Arthur No. 25, November 2006)
 Dodgem Logic #1–8 (Mad Love Publishing/Knockabout, 2009–2011)
 Buster Brown at the Barricades (in Occupy Comics #1–3, 2013)
 "Limehouse Variations" (in Lord of Strange Deaths: The Fiendish World of Sax Rohmer, 2015)

Introductions to work by others
 The Adventures of Luther Arkwright by Bryan Talbot
 Alec: Episodes From the Life of Alex McGarrity by Eddie Campbell (Escape, comic)
 Batman: The Dark Knight Returns by Frank Miller
 The Big Book of Everything by Hunt Emerson
 Bread and Wine: An Erotic Tale of New York by Samuel Delany
 Brickman Begins by Lew Stringer
 Cleveland by Harvey Pekar and Joseph Remnant
 Doc Chaos by Dave Thorpe
 Escape
 Erotic Comics 2: A Graphic History from the Liberated '70s to the Internet by Tim Pilcher, Abrams ComicArts, 2009
 Grendel: Devil by the Deed by Matt Wagner
 Greyshirt: Indigo Sunset by Rick Veitch
 Hellboy: Wake the Devil by Mike Mignola
 H. P. Lovecraft's The Haunter of the Dark by John Coulthart (also a kaballah of Lovecraft's gods)
 Mechanics by Jaime Hernandez (comic, 1st issue)
 Mr. Monster: His Book of Forbidden Knowledge by Michael T. Gilbert
 The One by Rick Veitch
 Planetary Volume 1 by Warren Ellis and John Cassaday
 Resist Everything Except Temptation: The Anarchist Philosophy of Oscar Wilde by Kristian Williams
 The Spiral Cage by Al Davison
 The Spirit Archives Volume 1 by Will Eisner
 The Suttons: Three Years in Maidstone by Phil Elliott
 Violent Cases by Neil Gaiman and Dave McKean
 Zero Girl by Sam Kieth

Audio recordings
 March of the Sinister Ducks b/w Old Gangsters Never Die (Single recorded by The Sinister Ducks, 1983)
 Hexentexts, 1994, Codex, Moore made one track and drew the cover
 The Birth Caul, 1996, D.O.R.; adapted for comics by Eddie Campbell, 1999, Eddie Campbell Comics
 The Moon and Serpent Grand Egyptian Theatre of Marvels, 1996, Cleopatra
 Brought to Light, 1998, Codex Books
 The Highbury Working, 2000, Re:
 Angel Passage, 2002, Re:
 Snakes and Ladders, 2003, Readapted for comics by Eddie Campbell, 2001, Eddie Campbell Comics
 Unearthing, 2010

Adaptations of Moore works in other media

Comics
 Alan Moore's The Courtyard, 2 issues (2003), Avatar Press; story by Moore, adapted for comics by Antony Johnston with artwork by Jacen Burrows. Collected into softcover and hardcover editions by Avatar Press (2004).
 Alan Moore's The Courtyard Companion (2004), Avatar Press; reprints Antony Johnston's script for Alan Moore's The Courtyard with annotations by NG Christakos, Moore's original short story (from which the series was adapted), new pinups/art by Jacen Burrows, and a new essay by Antony Johnson.
 Alan Moore's The Courtyard (Color Edition) (Avatar Press, 56 pages, 11 March 2009) This is a coloured version to the 2003 release.
 Alan Moore's Hypothetical Lizard, 4 issues (2005), Avatar Press. Collected in 2007. Adapted by Antony Johnston (writer) and Lorenzo Lorente (artist) from Moore's novelette
 Alan Moore's Magic Words (2002), Avatar Press; comics adaptations of four songs by Moore, various artists, with a cover by Juan José Ryp
 Alan Moore's Another Suburban Romance (2003), Avatar Press; play by Moore, adapted for comics by Antony Johnston and Juan José Ryp
 A Disease of Language (adapted by Eddie Campbell, from "The Birth Caul" and "Snakes and Ladders" with interview from Egomania Magazine, Knockabout Comics, hardcover, 160 pages, 2006) previously released as:
 The Birth Caul (1999), Eddie Campbell Comics; performance art piece adapted for comics by Eddie Campbell
 Snakes and Ladders (2001), Eddie Campbell Comics; performance art piece adapted for comics by Eddie Campbell
 Light of Thy Countenance (2009), Avatar Press, poem by Moore, adapted for comics by Antony Johnston with artwork by Felipe Massafera, 48-page, graphic novella, paperback January 2009, hardcover, June 2009
 Fashion Beast, 2012 comic series based on a 1988 unproduced screenplay by Moore for Sex Pistols manager Malcolm McLaren.

Films
 Ragnarok, 1982, a British mostly-animated sci-fi adventure, with story/script by Moore. (Character designed by Bryan Talbot.)
 The Return of Swamp Thing, 1989, directed by Jim Wynorski and partially inspired by Moore's comics run
 From Hell, 2001, adaptation directed by the Hughes Brothers
 The League of Extraordinary Gentlemen, 2003, adaptation directed by Stephen Norrington
 Constantine, 2005, based on the character John Constantine, created by Moore with Steve Bissette, John Totleben and Rick Veitch in Swamp Thing
 V For Vendetta, 2006, adaptation written by the Wachowskis; directed by James McTeigue (Moore had his name removed from the film, which is credited to "Based on the graphic novel illustrated by David Lloyd")
 Watchmen, 2009, adaptation written by David Hayter and Alex Tse; directed by Zack Snyder (Moore refused to be credited)
 Batman: The Killing Joke, 2016, adaptation written by Brian Azzarello; directed by Sam Liu; part of the DC Universe Animated Original Movies series

Television
 The Justice League Unlimited episode "For the Man Who Has Everything" is based on the Superman Annual story by Moore of the same name.
 The Constantine TV series, 2014–2015, and the animated web series. 2018–, based on the character John Constantine, created by Moore with Steve Bissette, John Totleben and Rick Veitch in Swamp Thing.
 The Supergirl episode "For the Girl Who Has Everything" is based on the Superman Annual story by Moore For the Man Who Has Everything.
 The Watchmen (2019) HBO Miniseries, a sequel to the limited comic book series of the same name.

Works about Alan Moore
There have been numerous works (books, films and academic studies) examining Moore and his output.

Books
 Alan Moore The Pocket Essentials (by Lance Parkin, 95 pages, Pocket Essentials, 2001)
 Kimota! The Miracleman Companion (by George Khoury, 148 pages, TwoMorrows Publishing, 2001)
 Alan Moore: Portrait of an Extraordinary Gentleman (by Gary Spencer Millidge and Smoky Man, 352 pages, Abiogenesis, 2003)
 The Extraordinary Works of Alan Moore (by George Khoury, 224 pages, TwoMorrows Publishing, 2003)
 Heroes & Monsters: The Unofficial Companion to the League of Extraordinary Gentlemen (by Jess Nevins, paperback, 239 pages, MonkeyBrain, 2003, Titan Books, 2006)
 Alan Moore Spells It Out (by Bill Baker, 80 pages, Airwave Publishing, 2005)
 A Blazing World: The Unofficial Companion to the Second League of Extraordinary Gentlemen (by Jess Nevins, paperback, 240 pages, MonkeyBrain, 2004, Titan Books, 2006)
 Alan Moore's Exit Interview (by Bill Baker, Airwave Publishing, August 2007)
 Impossible Territories: An Unofficial Companion to the League of Extraordinary Gentlemen The Black Dossier (by Jess Nevins, paperback, 304 pages, MonkeyBrain, forthcoming July 2008)
 The Extraordinary Works of Alan Moore – Indispensable Edition (by George Khoury, 240 pages, TwoMorrows Publishing, 2009)
 Alan Moore: Comics as Performance, Fiction as Scalpel by Annalisa Di Liddo, 212 pages, University Press of Mississippi, 2009, 
 Alan Moore: Storyteller (by Gary Spencer Millidge, 336 pages, ILEX, August 2011)
 Alan Moore: Conversations (by Eric L. Berlatsky, 240 pages, University Press of Mississippi, September 2011)
 Sexual Ideology in the Works of Alan Moore: Critical Essays on the Graphic Novels (edited by Todd A. Comer and Joseph Michael Sommers, 234 pages, McFarland, February 2012)
 Magic Words: the Extraordinary Life of Alan Moore (by Lance Parkin, 432 pages, Aurum, 2014)
 Alan Moore and the Gothic Tradition (edited by Matthew J. A. Green, 306 pages, Manchester University Press, August 2016)
 The British Invasion: Alan Moore, Neil Gaiman, Grant Morrison, and the Invention of the Modern Comic Book Writer (by Greg Carpenter, 490 pages, Sequart, August 2016)
 Alan Moore, Out from the Underground: Cartooning, Performance, and Dissent (by Maggy Gray, 311 pages, Palgrave Macmillan, November 2017)
 The Last War in Albion Volume 1: The Early Work of Alan Moore and Grant Morrison (by Elizabeth Sandifer, 803 pages, Eruditorum Press, October 2019)
 Alan Moore: A Critical Guide (by Jackson Ayres, 240 pages, Bloomsbury USA Academic, April 2021)

Films
 The Mindscape of Alan Moore, 2003, Shadowsnake Films (feature documentary on Moore)

References

External links
 Get Moore....For Free, collection of freely available Moore material
 Alan Moore Bibliography
 Alan Moore site bibliography
 
 
 
 Alan Moore at 2000 AD online
 

Bibliographies by writer
Lists of comics by creator